Dhalapara Union is a union of Ghatail Upazila, Tangail District, Bangladesh. It is situated 16 km east of Ghatail and 48 km northeast of Tangail, The District Headquarter.

Demographics

According to Population Census 2011 performed by Bangladesh Bureau of Statistics, The total population of Dhalapara union is 53221. There are  households 12148 in total.

Education

The literacy rate of Dhalapara Union is 30.7% (Male-34%, Female-27.5%).

See also
 Union Councils of Tangail District

References

Populated places in Dhaka Division
Populated places in Tangail District
Unions of Ghatail Upazila